This is a list of NGC objects 2001–3000 from the New General Catalogue (NGC). The astronomical catalogue is composed mainly of star clusters, nebulae, and galaxies. Other objects in the catalogue can be found in the other subpages of the list of NGC objects.

The constellation information in these tables is taken from The Complete New General Catalogue and Index Catalogue of Nebulae and Star Clusters by J. L. E. Dreyer, which was accessed using the "VizieR Service". Galaxy types are identified using the NASA/IPAC Extragalactic Database. The other data of these tables are from the SIMBAD Astronomical Database unless otherwise stated.

2001–2100

2101–2200

2201–2300

2301–2400

2401–2500

2501–2600

2601–2700

2701–2800

2801–2900

2901–3000

See also
 Lists of astronomical objects

References

 3
NGC objects 2001-3000